Borigumma is a town in Koraput district of Odisha state of India. It is located strategically between 3 of the major towns of undivided Koraput district - Jeypore, Nabarangpur and Kotpad and because of its location advantage as National Highway 26 and National Highway 201 passes through it, it is also known for its business activities.

History 
According to some locals, the name Borigumma is derived from two local words "Bori" means Indian jujube fruit (boro koli) and "Gumma" means high land. According to local old people there used to be a tall Boro Koli tree (Indian jujube tree) in the center of town.
The Bhairab Temple at Bhairabsingpur village of Borigumma is a protected monument and it is considered to be hundreds of years old.

Places of worship 
Temples in the area are the

 Bhairab Temple
 Jagannath Temple in the East.
 Manikeswari Temple in the South.
 Santoshimata Temple in the North.
 Hanuman Temple
 Sriram Temple
 Nilakantheswar Temple 
 Pataleshwar Temple 
 Nilamadhab Temple 
 Meria Temple 
 Trinath Temple 
 Budha Bhairab Temple.

Churches are

 Jeypore Evangelical Lutheran Church, Borigumma
 Beersheba Church of God, Borigumma
 Beersheba Church of God, Kenduguda
 Shalom Fellowship Church

and a Mosque.

Politics 
Borigumma falls under Jeypore Vidhan Sabha constituency of which Tara Prasad Bahinipati from INC is the current MLA. Borigumma falls under Koraput lok sabha constituency of which Saptagiri Sankar Ulaka from INC is the current MP.

Local festivals
The major festivals observed in Borigumma are Magha Mandei and Bali Yatra festival. Magha Mandei is observed in the month of February whereas Bali Yatra festival is observed in every three years of interval.

References

External links
 About Bhairab Temple

Cities and towns in Koraput district